Dimitris Vlastellis (Jimmys Vlastellis) (born 10 August 1982) is a retired Greek football player.

Career
Vlastellis began his playing career in Aiolikos F.C., where he was the star of the team. In July 2007, Vlastellis was transferred to Ethnikos Asteras F.C. He played for Ethnikos Asteras in the Greek Beta Ethniki until June 2009.

References

1982 births
Living people
Greek footballers
Ethnikos Asteras F.C. players
Association football forwards
People from Mytilene
Sportspeople from the North Aegean